Luis Burela is a village and rural municipality in Salta Province in northwestern Argentina.

The village is named after former mayor of Salta, and soldier Luis Burela.

References

Populated places in Salta Province